Alberto Gómez Carbonell (born 12 February 1988) is a Cuban footballer who plays for Dominican club Atlético Vega Real as a midfielder.

Club career
Nicknamed Beto, Gómez played for hometown team Guantánamo, before signing professional terms with Dominican club Atlético Vega Real alongside compatriot Roberto Peraza.

International career
He made his international debut for Cuba in a May 2011 friendly match against Nicaragua and has, as of January 2018, earned a total of 44 caps, scoring 2 goals. He represented his country in 10 FIFA World Cup qualifying matches and played at the 2011, 2013 and 2015 editions of the CONCACAF Gold Cup.

International goals
Scores and results list Cuba's goal tally first.

References

1988 births
Living people
Cuban footballers
Cuba international footballers
Association football midfielders
FC Guantánamo players
Atlético Vega Real players
Liga Dominicana de Fútbol players
2011 CONCACAF Gold Cup players
2013 CONCACAF Gold Cup players
2014 Caribbean Cup players
2015 CONCACAF Gold Cup players
Cuban expatriate footballers
Expatriate footballers in the Dominican Republic
Cuban expatriate sportspeople in the Dominican Republic
Sportspeople from Guantánamo
21st-century Cuban people